2-Oxo-PCE (also known as N-ethyldeschloroketamine, eticyclidone and O-PCE) is a dissociative anesthetic of the arylcyclohexylamine class that is closely related to deschloroketamine and eticyclidine, and has been sold online as a designer drug.

See also
 3-Chloro-PCP
 4-Keto-PCP
 Deoxymethoxetamine
 MXiPr
 Isoethcathinone

References 

Arylcyclohexylamines
Designer drugs
Dissociative drugs